Denizlispor, due to current sponsorship Altaş Denizlispor, is a Turkish sports club based in Denizli. It is known by its distinct green and black colors. The club's branches include football, volleyball, basketball, table tennis, and gymnastics. The Denizlispor football squad, which was founded in 1966, is the largest and most popular of the club’s teams. The team plays its home matches at the Denizli Atatürk Stadium, which has a seating capacity of up to 19,500 fans.

Denizlispor finished fifth in the 2001–02 Süper Lig, which qualified them for the UEFA Cup. In the 2002–03 UEFA Cup, the team defeated FC Lorient, Sparta Prague, and Olympique Lyonnais, before losing in the fourth round to FC Porto, who won the tournament.

History
Denizlispor Kulübü was founded on May 26, 1966 as a merger of  two smaller youth sports clubs, Çelik Yeşilspor Gençlik and Pamukkale Gençlik.  They joined to form what is now Denizlispor, which was at the time a little-known sports & youth club in the Çaybaşı district of Denizli city. This union was then registered with Turkish football's governing body, the Turkish Football Federation (TFF) under the name of Denizlispor Youth Club. The new football team joined Turkish football's 2nd division for the upcoming season on July 14, 1966.

Denizlispor's the best success was 5th twice in 2001–2002 and 2003–2004 seasons. Denizlispor's form declined after 2004–2005 season and struggled avoiding from relegation. Denizlispor drew 1–1 with Fenerbahçe and gave the championship to Galatasaray, Fenerbahçe's archrival at last week in 2005–2006 season. Denizlispor remained in Super League despite 3–0 loss to Ankaragücü at away match  on May 24, 2009, due to has an advantage against Konyaspor on dual average in 2008–2009 season. Denizlispor was relegated to TFF First League at next season after goalless draw with Ankaragücü at home match on April 24, 2010.

After the relegation in 2009-2010 season, Denizlispor had played at the TFF First League for 9 seasons. At the half of the season 2010-2011, Denizlispor took the 1st place. According to many football authorities, Denizlispor would again rise up Super League at the end of the season. But the team completed at 9th place at that season. At the following seasons, the team couldn't have any substantial success. The most important success was 9th place at 2010-2011.

Denizlispor became champion at the TFF First League in 2018-2019 season with getting 72 points and rose up Super League.

Crest and colours

The Denizlispor crest was designed by Yakup Ünel, a founding member of the team. The crest is based around a rooster, which is identified with the province of Denizli. The team's colours come from the colours of a type of rooster with green and black feathers unique to Denizli region.

Stadium

Denizlispor play their home matches in Denizli Atatürk Stadium. The stadium holds 15,427 people and was built in 1950. Denizlispor's first league match played against Eskişehirspor in 1983. The stadium does not have wire nets.

League participations
Süper Lig: 1983–88, 1994–97, 1999–2010, 2019–21
TFF First League: 1966–83, 1988–94, 1997–99, 2010–19, 2021–

European Cups
UEFA Cup/Europa League:

Intertoto Cup:

Past seasons

Last updated: 20 May 2022
Div. = Division; SL = Turkish Super League; 1L = TFF First League 2B = Turkish Second Football League, Group B;  2Rd = Turkish Second Football League, Red Group; 2Wh = Turkish Second Football League, White Group; Pos. = Position; Pl = Match played; W = Win; D = Draw; L = Lost; GS = Goal scored; GA = Goal against; P = Points
UCL = UEFA Champions League; UCWC = UEFA Cup Winners' Cup; UC = UEFA Cup; Cup = Turkey Cup.
Colors: Gold = winner; Silver = runner-up.

Players

Current squad

Other players under contract

Out on loan

Coaches

 Altan Santepe (1966–69)
 Kadri Aytaç (1969–70)
 Doğan Emültay (1970–72)
 İnanç Toker (1972–73)
 İsmail Kurt (1973–74)
 Melih Garipler (1974–75)
 Seracettin Kırklar (1975–76)
 İnanç Toker (1976–77)
 Şükrü Ersoy (1977–78)
 Melih Garipler (1978–79)
 Mustafa Özkula (1979–81)
 Refik Özvardar (1981–82)
 Halil Güngördü (1982–83)
 Doğan Andaç (1982–83)
 Nevzat Güzelırmak (1983–85)
 Özkan Sümer (1985–86)
 Nihat Atmaca (1986–87)
 Zeynel Soyuer (1987–88)
 Fethi Demircan (1988–89)
 Nihat Atacan (1989–90)
 Bülent Ünder (1990–91)
 Behzat Çınar (1991–92)
 Melih Garipler (1991–92)
 Ilker Küçük (1992–93)
 Gündüz Tekin Onay (1992–93)
 Ömer Kaner (1993–94)
 Ümit Kayıhan (1994–96)
 Behzat Çınar (1996–97)
 Melih Garipler (1996–97)
 Raşit Çetiner (1997–98)
 Ersun Yanal  (1998–2000)
 Tevfik Lav (2000–01)
 Yılmaz Vural (2000–01)
 Sakıp Özberk (2001–02)
 Rıza Çalımbay (2001–03)
 Giray Bulak (2003–05)
 Nurullah Sağlam (2006)
 Faruk Hadžibegić (2006)
 Güvenç Kurtar (2006–08)
 Ali Yalçın (2008)
 Ümit Kayıhan (2008–09)
 Mesut Bakkal (2009)
 Erhan Altın (2009)
 Nurullah Sağlam (2009)
 Hakan Kutlu (2009–10)
 Hamza Hamzaoğlu (2010–11)
 Güvenç Kurtar (2011)
 Serhat Güller (2011)
 Osman Özköylü (2011–12)
 Engin İpekoğlu (2012)
 Yusuf Şimşek (2012–13)
 Özcan Bizati (2013)
 Serdar Dayat (2013)
 Ümit Turmuş (2013)
 Özcan Bizati (2013–15)
 Engin İpekoğlu (2015)
 Mehmet Altıparmak (2015)
 Ali Yalçın (2015–16)
  Koray Palaz (2016)
 Selahattin Dervent (2016)
 Ali Tandoğan (2016–17)
 Ali Şimşek (2017)
 Yusuf Şimşek (2017)
 Reha Erginer (2017–18)
 Fatih Tekke (2018)
 Osman Özköylü (2018)
 Yücel İldiz (2018–19)
 Mehmet Özdilek (2019–20)
 Bülent Uygun (2020)
 Robert Prosinečki (2020)
 Kenan Atik (2020)
 Yalçın Koşukavak (2020–2021)
 Hakan Kutlu (2021)
 Ali Tandoğan (2021)
 Serhat Gülpınar (2021)
 Fatih Tekke (2021–2022)
 Mesut Bakkal (2022)
 Giray Bulak (2022–)

Sponsorships

Other branches
The club has football, basketball, table tennis, chess, figure skating and gymnastic teams. The club's most famous branch is football team.

References

External links
 Official website
 Denizlispor on TFF.org

 
Association football clubs established in 1966
Sport in Denizli
Football clubs in Turkey
1966 establishments in Turkey
Süper Lig clubs